Rudolf "Rudi" Smidts (born 12 August 1963 in Deurne) is a former Belgian football defender.

Club career
He played most of his career with FC Antwerp, the oldest club of Belgium.

International career
Smidts made 33 appearances for the Belgium national football team and was in the squad for the 1994 World Cup, where he played four matches.

Honours
Royal Antwerp

 Belgian Cup: 1991–92
 UEFA Cup Winners' Cup: 1992–93 (runners-up)

References

External links

 Profile - FC Antwerp

1963 births
Belgian footballers
Living people
Flemish sportspeople
Belgium international footballers
Royal Antwerp F.C. players
K.V. Mechelen players
R. Charleroi S.C. players
Beerschot A.C. players
1994 FIFA World Cup players
Belgian Pro League players
People from Deurne, Belgium

Association football defenders
Footballers from Antwerp